The Estrella Damm N.A. Andalucía Masters was a golf tournament on the European Tour. It was first played in 2010 at the Valderrama Golf Club in Sotogrande, Spain. It was played at the same location as the former Volvo Masters. The 2012 edition was cancelled, only a month before the event was due to start, as the new local government wished to cut costs. The event did not return until 2017, when it was hosted by 2011 champion Sergio García, who had hosted the Open de España at the same venue in 2016.

In 2019, the event was added to the Open Qualifying Series, giving up to three non-exempt players entry into The Open Championship.

The 2022 event became the final edition of the tournament due to LIV Golf acquiring Valderrama as a venue for the 2023 LIV Golf League. Having signed a five-year deal with LIV Golf, Valderrama was removed by the European Tour as one of their venues.

Winners

Notes

References

External links
Coverage on the European Tour's official site

Former European Tour events
Golf tournaments in Spain
Recurring sporting events established in 2010
2010 establishments in Spain